Tenuirostritermes cinereus is a species of termite in the family Termitidae. It is found in Central America and North America.

References

Further reading

 

Termites
Articles created by Qbugbot
Insects described in 1862